Epitaph is a live 4-CD set of concert performances and radio sessions from 1969 by the band King Crimson, released in 1997. Volumes 1 and 2 (Discs 1 and 2) were available in retail shops, and the set included a flyer with instructions on how to obtain Volumes 3 and 4 (Discs 3 and 4) via mail-order.  In 2006, volumes 3 and 4 were released independently as a 2-disc set via DGM.

Track listing
All tracks written by Robert Fripp, Michael Giles, Greg Lake, Ian McDonald and Peter Sinfield, unless otherwise indicated.

Personnel
Robert Fripp – guitar
Greg Lake – bass guitar, vocals
Ian McDonald – woodwinds, keyboards, mellotron, backing vocals
Michael Giles – drums, percussion, backing vocals

Charts

References

Live at the Fillmore East albums
1997 live albums
1997 compilation albums
King Crimson live albums
King Crimson compilation albums
Discipline Global Mobile albums